Japan's busiest airports are a series of lists ranking the fifty busiest airports in the country according to the number of total passengers, and also including statistics for total aircraft movements and total cargo movements, following the official register yearly. The data here presented are provided by the Ministry of Land, Infrastructure, Transport and Tourism (MLIT), and the results are for the calendar year (as the Ministry also presents yearly results for the fiscal year).

The lists are presented in chronological order starting from the latest year. The number of total passengers is measured in persons and includes any passenger that arrives, depart or travel on transit in every airport in the country. The number of total aircraft movements is estimated, measuring airplane-times and includes the departures and arrivals of any kind of aircraft in schedule or charter conditions. The number of total cargo movements in metric tonnes and includes all the movements of cargo and mail that arrives or departs from the airport.

In graph

2021 final statistics

The 50 busiest airports in Japan in 2021 ordered by total passenger traffic, according to the MLIT reports.

2020 final statistics
The 50 busiest airports in Japan in 2020 ordered by total passenger traffic, according to the MLIT reports.

2019 final statistics

The 50 busiest airports in Japan in 2019 ordered by total passenger traffic, according to the MLIT reports.

2018 final statistics

The 50 busiest airports in Japan in 2018 ordered by total passenger traffic, according to the MLIT reports.

2017 final statistics

The 50 busiest airports in Japan in 2017 ordered by total passenger traffic, according to the MLIT reports.

2016 final statistics

The 50 busiest airports in Japan in 2016 ordered by total passenger traffic, according to the MLIT reports.

2015 final statistics
The 50 busiest airports in Japan in 2015 ordered by total passenger traffic, according to the MLIT reports.

2014 final statistics

The 50 busiest airports in Japan in 2014 ordered by total passenger traffic, according to the MLIT reports.

2013 final statistics

The 50 busiest airports in Japan in 2013 ordered by total passenger traffic, according to the MLIT reports.

2012 final statistics

The 50 busiest airports in Japan in 2012 ordered by total passenger traffic, according to the MLIT reports.

2011 final statistics

The 50 busiest airports in Japan in 2011 ordered by total passenger traffic, according to the MLIT reports.

2010 final statistics

The 50 busiest airports in Japan in 2010 ordered by total passenger traffic, according to the MLIT reports.

2009 final statistics

The 50 busiest airports in Japan in 2009 ordered by total passenger traffic, according to the MLIT reports.

2008 final statistics

The 50 busiest airports in Japan in 2008 ordered by total passenger traffic, according to the MLIT reports.

2007 final statistics
The 50 busiest airports in Japan in 2007 ordered by total passenger traffic, according to the MLIT reports.

2006 final statistics

The 50 busiest airports in Japan in 2006 ordered by total passenger traffic, according to the MLIT reports.

2005 final statistics

The 50 busiest airports in Japan in 2005 ordered by total passenger traffic, according to the MLIT reports.

2004 final statistics

The 50 busiest airports in Japan in 2004 ordered by total passenger traffic, according to the MLIT reports.

2003 final statistics

The 50 busiest airports in Japan in 2003 ordered by total passenger traffic, according to the MLIT reports.

2002 final statistics

The 50 busiest airports in Japan in 2002 ordered by total passenger traffic, according to the MLIT reports.

2001 final statistics

The 50 busiest airports in Japan in 2001 ordered by total passenger traffic, according to the MLIT reports.

2000 final statistics

The 50 busiest airports in Japan in 2000 ordered by total passenger traffic, according to the MLIT reports.

References

Japan
 
Airports